Ischnocnemis minor is a species of beetle in the family Cerambycidae. It was described by Bates in 1880.

References

Trachyderini
Beetles described in 1880